The  Reptile project is an exploratory development of uranium deposits in the Erongo Region of western of Namibia run by Deep Yellow Limited. It includes prospecting areas known as Tubas-Tumas and Tubas Red Sand. Tubas-Tumas has  estimated reserves of 22.7 million tonnes of ore grading 0.03% uranium. Tubas Red Sand has estimated reserves of 90.8 million tonnes of ore grading 0.012% uranium.

References

External links 
 Reptile Project, Deep Yellow Limited, retrieved 10 October 2018.

Uranium mines in Namibia